Luca Nardi (born 6 August 2003) is an Italian professional tennis player.

Nardi has a career-high ATP singles ranking of world No. 126, which he first achieved in 7 November 2022. He also has a career-high ATP doubles ranking of world No. 313, attained in 3 October 2022.

Career

2020–2021: ATP debut
Nardi made his ATP main draw debut at the 2020 European Open in singles, where he lost to Marcos Giron in three sets, and in doubles partnering Zane Khan.

He reached career-high rankings of World No. 356 in singles and No. 544 in doubles on 13 December 2021 after reaching the semifinals in singles and quarterfinals in doubles respectively as a wildcard at the 2021 Città di Forlì III Challenger.

2022: Three Challenger titles, Top 150 & first ATP win
In the first week of the 2022 ATP Challenger Tour, Nardi won his first Challenger title at the 2022 Città di Forlì Challenger, defeating Mukund Sasikumar in the final. As a result he reached the top 300 on 17 January 2022 at world No. 296.

He won his second Challenger title at the 2022 Challenger Città di Lugano, defeating Leandro Riedi in the final. He won his third Challenger title at the 2022 Rafa Nadal Open in Mallorca, beating Zizou Bergs in the final. This was his first Challenger win on an outdoor hard court. He made his debut in the top 150 at world no. 142 on 12 September 2022.

At the ATP 500 2022 Astana Open he qualified into the main draw defeating top seed David Goffin. He won his first ATP match and first at the ATP 500 tour-level defeating fellow qualifier  Alexander Shevchenko to reach the second round. He lost to third seed Stefanos Tsitsipas in straight sets.

ATP Challenger and ITF World Tennis Tour Finals

Singles: 8 (6–2)

Doubles: 1 (1–0)

References

External links
 
 

2003 births
Living people
Italian male tennis players
21st-century Italian people